Paul Charles Denyer (born 14 April 1972, known briefly as Paula whilst in prison) is an Australian serial killer currently serving three consecutive sentences of life imprisonment with a non-parole period of 30 years for the murders of three young women in Melbourne, in 1993. Denyer became known in the media as the Frankston Serial Killer as his crimes occurred in the neighbouring suburbs of Frankston. Later, during his imprisonment, when aged around 30, Denyer began identifying as a transgender woman, but was refused permission by prison authorities to wear make-up, receive sex reassignment surgery, or legally alter his name. In the 2022 Stan documentary No Mercy, No Remorse, presenter John Silvester (Senior Crime Reporter, The Age, Melbourne) states that Denyer has reverted to identifying as Paul.

Early life
Denyer was born as Paul Charles Denyer on 14 April 1972 to British immigrant parents, Anthony and Maureen Denyer in Campbelltown, New South Wales, an outer suburb of Sydney. His parents had immigrated to Australia in 1965, before moving to Adelaide, and in 1981, the family (now including five sons and a daughter) relocated to Melbourne. Denyer then reportedly had difficulty fitting in amongst his peers in his new town, which led to problems with study and self-confidence that were worsened by significant weight gain during his teen years. At age 11, he slashed the throat of his sister's teddy bear, and cut the throat of the family cat before hanging it in a tree; at age 13, was arrested and cautioned for stealing a car; and at age 15, for assaulting a fellow student. After school, he had problems holding down jobs, was fired seven times, and failed a physical when trying to enter Victoria Police.

Crimes
Denyer, aged 20–21 started to stalk and attack a number of women in and around the Melbourne suburb of Frankston during a five-month period in 1993. The first known incident attributed to Denyer occurred in February 1993, when Donna Vanes' Claude Street unit in Seaford was broken into. After a series of disturbing prank-calls, Vanes was fearful of being alone. Arriving home with her boyfriend at around 1:00am, having been out for about an hour, they found that her cats' throats had been slashed, as had the walls, furniture, and some of her baby's clothes. Female pornographic imagery was also found, and the message "Donna you’re dead" written in blood on the wall. Unwilling to stay at the unit, she moved in with her sister, who was living in the unit next to Denyer, and whose neighbour had also recently been the victim of a break-in slasher.

The first murder victim was 18-year-old Elizabeth Stevens, who had come to Melbourne from Tasmania in January 1993 to study at TAFE Frankston. Living in Paterson Avenue, Langwarrin, with her aunt and uncle, she had alighted from a bus at the stop on Cranbourne Road, on Friday 11 June. As she had been expected home at around 8:00pm, her uncle started searching for her in his car at 10:00pm, and the police were notified around 1:00am, but little could be done given the bad weather that day. The next morning a man found her partially concealed body in Lloyd Park Reserve: she had been strangled, stabbed, her throat had been slashed, and a criss-cross pattern was carved into her chest.

A month later, on Thursday 8 July, 41-year-old Rosza Toth alighted at Seaford railway station, and headed north along Railway Parade on her way home. Around 5:50pm, as she walked past Seaford North Reserve, she noticed a man loitering near the toilet block, and was attacked shortly after passing him. Toth was dragged into the park, but broke free after Denyer held a fake gun to her head, and she pretended to submit. Shaken, and with light injuries, she then ran back to the road, stopped a car, and was assisted by the driver back to her house.

That same night the second murder victim, 22-year-old Deborah Fream who lived near Kananook Station, Seaford, was abducted in her car in the early evening. She had left her 12-day-old son at home with a male friend when she went out at 7:00pm on a short trip to buy some milk for an omelette dinner. By 8:00pm, when she still had not returned, he called her boyfriend, the police, and the local hospital seeking news of her whereabouts and possible accidents. The friend and boyfriend drove around trying to locate her, then reported her missing at Frankston Police Station. On the afternoon of Monday 12 July, a farmer found Fream's partially covered body on Taylors Road, Carrum Downs; like Stevens, she had been strangled, savagely slashed, and her throat cut.

On Friday 30 July, the third and final victim, 17-year-old schoolgirl Natalie Russell, was attacked while walking home from John Paul College. At the time there was media speculation, heightened public fear, and warnings from her school. Russell took her usual short cut home to Frankston North, via a fenced walkway (now called Nat's Track in her memory) which passes between two golf courses on Skye Road. At 8:00pm, Russell was reported missing to Frankston Police Station, and a police search soon found her body. She had been dragged from the path through a large hole in a wire fence into adjacent scrub. She had died in a similar manner to the others, but during the attack she had put up a considerable fight, which assisted investigators due to DNA evidence finally being available at the scene.

Investigation 
Police became involved with the case after the incidents at Denyer's block of units, where the first slasher break-in occurred, and at Vanes' unit in February 1993. The murder of Stevens was the first incident to attract a large investigation, as did the disappearance of Fream, when a search was organised and scuba divers examined the Kananook Creek. No external forensic evidence was found at the Stevens scene, and no witnesses came forward. With Fream, again, no foreign forensic evidence was found at the scene due to poor weather, but witnesses later recalled her car, a gray Nissan Pulsar, had been seen driving erratically and flashing its high-beam lights. Her car was located by police the next day at nearby Madden Street, and forensics found traces of Fream's blood inside, alongside a new dent in the front, and the driver's seat pushed back. Denyer later explained how, at the milk bar, Fream had left her car unlocked, and he had climbed into the back seat, and threatened her with the gun shortly after she drove from the store.

After the second attack, and with Toth's description (she described her attacker as 18–20 years old, 180 cm tall, with a round face and blue-eyes), police drew up a profile of the suspect: a male, likely unemployed or with a menial job, likely a local resident, aged 18–24, average looking, and living alone. The Russell attack provided police with the breakthrough they needed. At 2:30pm, a postal worker saw a rusted yellow Toyota Corona without number plates parked near Nat's Track on Skye Road, with a man using binoculars acting suspiciously inside. As she stopped at a house to call police, she noticed Russell approaching the track alone, observed by the suspicious man, who then ran up the track. Police responded, noted the registration label number, door-knocked a few nearby houses, but soon had to leave to attend to another call before the man returned. The later forensic investigations of the walkway revealed three holes cut in the fence with the same tool, with blood traces on one, alongside skin and hair traces on Russell but not belonging to the victim. Police also informed investigators of the registration details, which were quickly traced to the car's owner, Paul Charles Denyer.

Detectives visited his small unit at 186 Frankston‑Dandenong Road, Seaford, the afternoon of 31 July - a unit shared with Denyer's girlfriend, and next door to Donna Vanes' sister. While his movements were being checked, he admitted to being in the vicinity of the Fream and Russell murders at the time. Denyer was then taken to Frankston Police Station, and his videoed interview commenced at 9:20pm. He was unable to adequately explain the cuts and scratches the officers noticed, and also admitted being in the vicinity of the Stevens attack. He agreed to have his DNA collected, and early on 1 August, suspecting that the police had DNA evidence, admitted to the murders, the Toth assault, and the slasher break-ins. Denyer also told detectives that he had been stalking women in the Frankston area "for years", and that the motivation for the crimes was a desire to kill from the age of 14 and a general hatred of girls and women.

Trial and imprisonment
Denyer was charged with three murder counts and one of abduction, charges to which he later pleaded guilty and did not contest. Psychologists and experts examined Denyer, noting a lack of emotion regarding the crimes, a single-minded desire to kill, and the unusual randomness by which victims were chosen, leading to a diagnosis of sadistic personality disorder but not legal insanity. During examination, he also admitted being influenced by the 1987 film, The Stepfather. On 20 December 1993, after four days of hearings, he was sentenced in Melbourne's Supreme Court to three consecutive sentences of life imprisonment with no parole period. On 31 December, however, Denyer lodged an appeal, which was heard in July 1994 - granting him a non-parole period of 30 years (until 2023).

Denyer was sent initially to HM Prison Barwon, and is currently at Port Phillip Prison. On 9 January 2004, after 10 years in jail, Denyer was the subject of a 7:30 Report titled "Murderer's sex change request sparks rights debate". In September 2004, news broke of a letter Denyer had sent to his estranged brother (who he had accused in his trial of sexually abusing him as a child) and sister-in-law who had re-emigrated to the UK. In July 2012, Denyer again came to the attention of the media over allegations of four rapes conducted over a six-week period. In April 2013, the Herald Sun created a website with images of 14 letters, written by Denyer in 2003 and 2004 to another inmate, titled "The Paul Denyer Letters". On 8 April, the newspaper also ran articles related to analyses of the letters and handwriting.

Gender identity 
According to the first of "The Paul Denyer Letters", dated 29 November 2003, Denyer began identifying as a woman that same year. Denyer has claimed that these feelings of gender dysphoria are what led him to seek revenge against women by murdering them. In "Letter 6", dated 4 February 2004, he wrote: "I committed these disgusting crimes ... not because I ever hated womankind, but because I have never really felt that I was male."

Denyer began wearing women's clothing and cosmetics in prison, in defiance of prison orders. Medical specialists evaluated whether Denyer could receive sex reassignment surgery and rejected the idea. Prisoner support groups said that he "cannot be anything but serious" about his transition, given that it would entail personal risk. One victim's mother said Denyer's transition made her and her husband feel "sick", calling it a "stunt".

Denyer has since reverted to identifying as Paul.

Media
Australian author Vikki Petraitis has written a number of texts on the case:

 The Frankston Murders – the true story of serial killer, Paul Denyer, 1995
 "The Frankston Murders and The Paedophile Witch" in Outside the Law, 2008
 The Frankston Murders: 25 Years On, 2018

The case was covered by Casefile True Crime Podcast on 18 and 25 June 2016. It was also covered by Australian True Crime in July 2018 when Petratis was interviewed and again in September 2017 when investigator Charlie Bezzina was interviewed.

See also
 Timeline of major crimes in Australia
 Crawford family murder
 Crime in Australia
 Tynong North and Frankston Murders

References

Further reading

External links
 (Application for special leave to appeal).

1972 births
Australian serial killers
Australian murderers of children
Australian people convicted of murder
Criminals from Melbourne
Living people
Murder in Melbourne
People convicted of murder by Victoria (Australia)
People with sadistic personality disorder
Prisoners sentenced to life imprisonment by Victoria (Australia)
Australian prisoners sentenced to multiple life sentences
1993 murders in Australia